Phostria marginalis is a moth in the family Crambidae. It was described by Hans Georg Amsel in 1956 and is found in Venezuela.

References

Phostria
Moths described in 1956
Moths of South America